Forgotten Roads: The Best of If was British jazz-rock group If's first compilation album, released on CD twenty years after the band's dissolution in 1975. The tracks and line-up were from the first three If albums. It was followed two years later by a collection of live recordings from tours in Europe.

Track listing 

"Here Comes Mr Time" (John Mealing, Trevor Preston)
"Fibonacci's Number" (Dave Quincy)
"Sunday Sad" (Dick Morrissey)
"What Did I Say about the Box, Jack?" (Morrissey) 
"Forgotten Roads" (Quincy, Preston)
"Seldom Seen Sam" (Terry Smith, J.W. Hodkinson)
"Child of Storm" (Quincy, Hodkinson)
"Sweet January" (Quincy, Preston)
"Upstairs" (Morrissey, Brigitta Morrissey)
"I'm Reaching out on All Sides" (Quiny, Fishman) 
"What Can a Friend Say?" (Quincy)

Personnel
Dennis Elliott – drums
J.W. Hodkinson –- lead vocals and percussion
John Mealing – keyboards and backing vocals
Dick Morrissey – tenor/soprano saxophones and flute
Dave Quincy – tenor/alto saxophones
Jim Richardson – bass
Terry Smith – guitar

References

1995 compilation albums
If (band) albums